

Nabu

Nabu is a fictional character appearing in American comic books published by DC Comics. First appearing in More Fun Comics #67 in May 1941, he is a major supporting character in Doctor Fate titles. A fictionalized version of the Mesopotamian god of the same name, he frequently serves as the first person to call himself Doctor Fate before serving as a guiding force and mentor of several bearers of Doctor Fate, notably being his agents for the Lords of Order.

Over time, Nabu is characterized as cold and relentless in his battles against the Lords of Chaos, resorting to manipulating his first apprentice by usurping control of Kent Nelson's mind and body while being the chief cause of Inza's mental breakdown. This characterization becomes consistent although the character has also attempted to learn from his errors. In modern continuities, while his history of his mental control over Nelson is intact, he agrees to cede control to Khalid Nassour, favoring his newest host.

Fictional history 
Shortly after the formation of the universe, two elemental forces were born: the Lords of Order and the Lords of Chaos. As the two emerged, both forces struggle for supremacy over the other. The Lords of Order manifest as the first sentience race in the universe as disembodied magical beings, in which included Nabu. As a Lord of Order, he was one of the first beings to contribute to the creation of the universe. Eventually assigned to the mortal world of Earth, he adopted a human form and descended to Earth from Cilia, and became Nabu the Wise, an advisor to the pharaohs of ancient Egypt. He served as a court magician for various Egyptian pharaohs including Khufu and Ramses.

During his time with Ramses, Nabu tried to warn the pharaoh and subsequently his son against persecuting the escaping Jews, led by Moses. One night, Nabu was visited by the Spectre, who warned that every firstborn Egyptian child would be killed by him except for Hebrew slaves. This horrified the magician and he prepared to fight the Spectre with all of his powers but was defeated despite his preparations. The humiliated mystic returned to the pharaoh who had lost his son and, in despair, agreed to free the Hebrew slaves, but then decided to send his army to kill them to annoy God. Despite his plans, the Pharaoh was killed when the Spectre brought the Red Sea crashing into the Egyptian army after Moses and the Israelites had crossed.

Nabu became the guardian of several powerful talismans, in 2578 BC, when Egypt had fallen under the rule of the Vandal Savage, who had assumed the identity of Pharaoh Khafre. Around this time, Bonnie Baxter of the Masters of Time had come from the 20th century, where Khafre's guards threw her into a prison cell. Nabu appeared before her and led her to safety with his magic and asked for her help in overthrowing the immortal Khafre. He intended to combine magic with the science of the time traveler where she gave him her communicator. By combining the pair, he created the Blue Beetle of Khaji-Da, which Bonnie used to overthrow the pharaoh who was wrapped in bandages to contain him, as his immortality would cause him to rise again. The Beetle was lost for 4,500 years before being rediscovered in the 20th century by archaeologist Dan Garrett, who became the first Blue Beetle.

During the Theban dynasty, Nabu the Wise served as an advisor to Prince Khufu Kha-taar, where he served with his ally Teth-Adam. One day, they witnessed a Thanagarian spacecraft crashed and they headed to catch up, they arrived at the scene of the dying pilots where Nabu conjured a spell to translate their alien language that spoke of imminent danger in the far future after this they died. From the ship, they discovered the existence of Nth Metal, which Khufu forged into weapons for his use, and Nabu tried to prepare them, as it was determined that the prince and his fiancée had a role to play in this conflict. During this time, they encountered a traveler who could travel at high speeds and gave him a war glove forged from portions of the Nth Metal called the "Claw of Horus", which they predicted would be instrumental in a battle of thousands of years in the world.

In 1920, archaeologist Sven Nelson and his son Kent go on an expedition to the Valley of Ur. While exploring a temple discovered by his father, Kent opens the tomb of Nabu the Wise and revives him from suspended animation, accidentally releasing a poisonous gas which kills Sven. Nabu takes pity on Kent and teaches him the skills of a sorcerer over the next twenty years before giving him a mystical helmet, amulet, and cloak. In 1940, Kent meets Inza Cramer and Wotan in Alexandria, Egypt on his way back to America. After arriving back in the United States, Kent begins a career fighting crime and supernatural evil as the sorcerer and superhero Doctor Fate and sets up a base in a tower in Salem, Massachusetts. Due to Nabu occasionally possessing him, he converted to half of the helm to regain control but at the cost of halving the power.

After Kent's death, Nabu chooses Eric Strauss and his stepmother Linda to be the next Doctor Fate, with Eric and Linda having to merge into one being to become Fate. Nabu goes on to possess Kent's corpse to personally advise them. The three of them are soon joined by a friendly demon called Petey and lawyer Jack C. Small. Eric is killed on Apokolips during a battle with Desaad, forcing Linda to become Doctor Fate on her own. Linda is killed soon afterwards by the Lords of Chaos. Despite their grim fates, Eric and Linda's souls are reincarnated in the bodies of Eugene and Wendy DiBellia while Nabu reincarnates in Eugene and Wendy's unborn child.

Eventually, Nabu came into conflict with the Spectre when he began hunting down and killing other Lords of Chaos and Order. In Infinite Crisis, Alexander Luthor, Jr. revealed that he had sent Superboy-Prime to recover the black diamond and that the Psycho-Pirate delivered it to Loring on Alex's orders and had Eclipso-Loring manipulated the Spectre by convincing him magic was an abomination to God and into breaking down magic into its more raw energy form, in which doing so killed the Lords of Chaos and Order in the process. In doing so, Alexander could use them for his own ends. After killing other Lords of Order including the Wizard Shazam, Nabu was the last one to face him. Nabu put up a valiant fight against the Spectre but knew he would lose this battle and instead, opted to fight at a level for the Presence to take notice. Je was fatally injured but ultimately stopped the Spectre. Nabu, in his final act, passed his Helm of Fate to Detective Chimp and tasked him to find one worthy of the mantle. With his death, the 9th Age of Magic had ended and the 10th Age of Magic begun.

The New 52 
In 2011, "The New 52" rebooted the DC universe and a new version of Nabu appeared. Nabu had the appearance of a legless entity with an elderly appearance and a more peaceful personality. He was a Lord of Order and said to be a wise servant of Thoth. Residing in the Helm of Fate, he would team up with Kent Nelson as Doctor Fate and later Khalid Nassour.

Other versions 
In Futures End, John Constantine is able to set a trap for Nabu, who had been summoning countless people to try to be consumed by the helmet. John made a deal with a demon to summon the god Anubis to judge Nabu. He was found guilty of caring only for himself and killed, with the demon now trapped within the Helmet of Destiny.

In other media 
 Nabu appears in the Batman: The Brave and the Bold episode "The Fate of Equinox!", voiced by James Arnold Taylor.
 Nabu appears briefly in flashbacks depicted in Suicide Squad: Hell to Pay. He initially chooses Steel Maxum to become Doctor Fate until the latter loses the "Get Out of Hell Free" card and replaces him with "some chick" according to Maxum.
 Nabu appears in Young Justice, voiced by Kevin Michael Richardson. This version was originally "Marduk", the mortal son of Vandal Savage from ancient Babylon who was killed by Klarion the Witch Boy via Starro. Seeking a means to combat the Lords of Chaos following their sinking of Atlantis, the Lords of Order elevate Marduk's soul to their plane of existence and bind him to the Helmet of Fate.
 Nabu appears in Injustice 2, voiced by David Sobolov. He forces Kent Nelson not to interfere with Brainiac's conquest of Earth to maintain balance between order and chaos on the Lords of Order's behalf until Superman crushes the Helmet of Fate.

Naiad

Natas

Nebula Man

Negative Flash 
The Negative Flash or the Dark Flash is an alias used by several characters appearing in American comic books published by DC Comics as a dark counterpart of the Flash. The "Dark Flash" was created by Mark Waid and Paul Pelletier, and first appeared in The Flash (vol. #2) #150 (July 1999) while the "Negative Flash" was created by Joshua Williamson, Paul Pelletier and Howard Porter, and first appeared in The Flash (vol. 5) #26 (September 2017).

Walter West 
 
Walter West, an alternate version of Wally West, is known as the Dark Flash.

Barry Allen 
 
During DC Rebirth, Barry Allen was the first version of Negative Flash due being corrupted by the Negative Speed Force thanks to Professor Zoom / Reverse-Flash and while dealing with Bloodwork.

Meena Dhawan 
 Meena Dhawan was the second version of Negative Flash when revived by Black Hole and brainwashed by Gorilla Grodd.

Negative Flash in other media 
 The Walter West incarnation of the Dark Flash appears as an alternate costume for Wally West / Flash in the video game Justice League Heroes. 
 Several versions appear in The Flash. 
 One variation is the Dark Flash (stylized as the Negative Flash) in season six where it's Barry Allen / The Flash (portrayed by Grant Gustin) while corrupted by Bloodwork. 
 Another variation is Eobard Thawne / Reverse-Flash (portrayed by Tom Cavanagh) twice: the first time during the "Crisis on Earth-X" crossover special and the second is as the Negative Speed Force's avatar in season eight.

Negative Man

Nekron

Nemesis

Nemesis Kid

Neon the Unknown

Nereus
King Nereus is a fictional character who first appeared in Aquaman (vol. 7) #19 as part of The New 52 reboot and was created by Geoff Johns and Paul Pelletier. The character is depicted in the comics as Xebel's military chief and later ruler after the death of King Ryus, the father of Mera. He was also Mera's former fiancee before Aquaman.

In other media, the character is instead cast as Mera's father in several adaptations such as Young Justice and the DC Extended Universe movie, Aquaman, where he is played by Dolph Lundgren. Lundgren is set to reprise his role in Aquaman and the Lost Kingdom.

Fictional history 
In his earlier life, Nereus started out as a Xebel military chief to King Ryus and was to be betrothed to the king's daughter Mera. Before the wedding, Mera were tasked to kill the King of Atlantis as part of their kingdom's revenge for their imprisonment in the Bermuda Triangle by Atlantis centuries ago..

When King Ryus died and Mera fell in love with Aquaman, Nereus was sworn in as the new King of Xebel. Some years later, Mera returned to Xebel, where Nereus discovered that Mera did not kill Aquaman. When Nereus tried to kill Mera, the enemy in ice that pursued Mera appeared and froze all of Xebel. The frozen enemy introduced himself as Atlan the First King of Atlantis, who had awakened from his slumber and wanted his kingdoms back. Nereus swore his allegiance to the Dead King Atlan. When Aquaman arrived, he and Mera fled from Xebel when Nereus and his men pursued them. Nereus led his forces into invading Atlantis, where Mera was captured.

Some months later, Nereus was tasked by Atlan to find the other four Atlantean kingdoms where the Trench, the first one that was found, was. After Atlan was defeated, Nereus found the Ocean Master in Louisiana and told him that he knows where the other four Atlantean kingdoms are.

Nereus in other media

 Nereus appears in the DC Extended Universe film Aquaman, portrayed by Dolph Lundgren. This version is Mera's father. 
 In the first Aquaman film, using a submarine provided to him by David Kane, Orm tricks Nereus into siding with him in his campaign against the surface world while arranging for Mera to be betrothed to him. After Mera helps Aquaman escape, Orm tells Nereus that Mera perished in the escape. Nereus accompanied Orm in his trip to the Kingdom of the Fishermen. When the Fisherman King Ricou turned down Orm's offer, he was killed while Nereus killed the two guards that tried to avenge him. Nereus then watched as Orm persuaded King Ricou's wife Queen Rina and daughter Princess Scales to take the offer. During the attack on the Kingdom of the Brine where Orm became the Ocean Master, Nereus fought the Brine soldiers and told the Ocean Master that they need the Brine King alive. When Aquaman arrives on the back of the leviathan Karathan and summons an army of sea creatures, Nereus is told by Princess Scales that Aquaman is also commanding the Trench, which Nereus considered impossible. Mera finds her father and informs him that Aquaman has King Atlan's trident, causing Nereus to switch sides. He then watches Aquaman's duel with the Ocean Master, where Aquaman is victorious, and even sees Atlanna appear. As the Ocean Master is taken away by the Atlantean guards, Nereus and the other Atlantean kingdoms accept Aquaman as their leader.
 A version of Nereus named Ryus Nereus appears in Young Justice, being a combination of the Ryus character and Nereus character from the comics. This version, while sharing the name of Ryus, is instead characterized more similarly to Nereus from the comics and is portrayed as an abrasive ruler of Xebel and a political rival of Aquaman.  During the events of season four, Nereus is reluctant to trust the seemingly resurrected Arion (who is truly Ocean Master in a cloned body of Arion) and transfer his rulership power to him. He later supports his daughter's nomination as Atlantis's new High King. 

 Nereus appears in Lego DC Super-Villains as part of the "Aquaman" DLC.

Neutron

New Wave

Carter Nichols
Professor Carter Nichols is a fictional character, a comic book scientist published by DC Comics. He first appeared in Batman #24 (August 1944), and was created by Joe Samachson and Dick Sprang.

Professor Nichols was created to lend some sci-fi "color" to Batman stories to both Batman and World's Finest Comics, during a period where more conventional superhero tales were out of favor and most remaining books of the genre drifted into science fiction and related genres.

Carter Nichols is a childhood friend of Thomas Wayne. His appearances nearly always involved some form of time travel, based around his particular specialty referred to as "time travel hypnosis", a process that simulated time travel. The stories themselves are less than clear on this respect. At some point, he develops a "Time-Ray Machine" which he used to both displace and track objects through time. Professor Carter Nichols used his "time travel hypnosis" when he does therapy sessions with Bruce Wayne and Dick Grayson. Their first session with Carter Nichols started when Carter hypnotized Bruce into ending up in ancient Rome where he saves a man from being beaten up in the streets by some men. When Batman ends up in trouble in the past where he is caught by soldiers working for Publius Malchio, Dick Grayson has Carter hypnotize him as well so that he can save him. Dick saves him and the court jester where they beat Publius in a chariot race and exile him from Rome. Afterwards, Bruce and Dick are brought out of their hypnotic spell and return to the present.

Carter hypnotizes Bruce and Dick where they end up 300 years in the past where they meet D'Artagnan and The Three Musketeers. When D'Artagnan ends up injured in a fight with Cardinal Richelieu's guards, Batman takes his place and prevents Lady Constance from being poisoned as history stated. After that mission, Batman sheds his disguise and returns to the present with Dick.

Carter hypnotizes Bruce and Dick where they end up back in time at Camelot to discover the secret of Sir Hardi Le Noir. They start by protecting Merlin's niece Aline from Sir Mordred and his men which leads to Batman and Robin being brought before King Arthur. Batman bests Sir Mordred in combat. Batman, Robin, Lancelot, and Aline then try to rescue Merlin who is a prisoner of Morgan Le Fay who looks like Catwoman. Batman's modern science is thought to be wizardry, and he completes the mission, though Morgan Le Fay escapes. Afterwards, King Arthur awards Batman a knighthood naming him Sir Hardi Le Noir (translated as the Bold Black Knight).

Carter hypnotizes Bruce and Dick where they end up back in time to witness the first Olympic Games. Batman befriends several of the athletes as a group of Persians try to disrupt the Olympic Games to start a civil war. Batman and Robin help the athletes defeat the Persians, take the place of the injured athletes in the Olympic Games, and return to the present.

When Bruce is confounded by the mystery of his ancestor Silas Wayne (who was a silversmith and suspected highwayman), he has Carter hypnotize him where he arrives in 1787 to learn the truth about his ancestor. Batman and Robin stop a group of highwaymen where they are soon suspected of the crime themselves. Luckily for them, Benjamin Franklin was able to vouch for them as Batman concludes that Silas was framed as the highwaymen's leader. The real identity of the highwaymen leader is Henry, a former Tory. Silas Wayne loves Henry's sister Martha and agrees to take the blame as the highwayman to protect Martha's mother. Benjamin Franklin gives Silas Wayne a letter which proves his innocence to be used after Martha's mother dies. However, Silas dies first. Bruce later finds the letter hidden inside Silas Wayne 's portrait and Silas is finally cleared one hundred years later.

Carter hypnotizes Bruce and Dick where they end up five centuries in the past to investigate the sighting of a Batman in Milan. They end up meeting Leonardo da Vinci who shows them his great works and learn that he is at odds with a dictator named Gian Trivulao. Batman helps Leonardo da Vinci to publicly humiliate Gian Trivulao. In the process, Leonardo uses a flying machine of his own invention. Men who see him believe they see a "Batman" who uses magic. With Leonardo safely away to Florence, Bruce and Dick return to their own time with an explanation for the "Batman" existing in Milan.

Carter Nichols sends himself back in time to meet the real Baron Frankenstein. Carter sees Baron Frankenstein's experiments and meets his giant assistant Ivan. When Ivan is accidentally electrocuted, Carter revives him with adrenaline. However, Ivan is left in a trance like state. Frankenstein's cousin Count Mettern then orders Ivan to kill Baron Frankenstein. Carter summons Batman and Robin from the future. They battle Ivan who rampages through the nearby village. Count Mettern then attempts to make Batman his slave too. Batman is not affected like Ivan was. He is then able to revive Ivan fully. However, the villagers are angry at Baron Frankenstein and Ivan. When they storm the castle, Batman must calm them down. Ivan then takes revenge upon Count Mettern. Both men die when the castle explodes. Mary Shelley writes about the events, but fictionalizes the story for fear that it would never be believed.

When the curator of the Gotham Museum buys a treasure map that belongs to Henry Morgan, Bruce Wayne finds his handwriting on it and has Carter hypnotize Bruce and Dick into sending them back in time to investigate. They end up captured by Henry Morgan even when Batman manages to injure him. Batman reluctantly draws a treasure map to Henry Morgan's treasure in Florida. Batman changes some of the numbers so that Henry Morgan is never able to recover his treasure. When Bruce returns to his own time, the treasure is still where it was originally buried. The recovered treasure is then given to the Gotham Museum.

When Bruce Wayne finds an Arabian rug on auction with a picture that resembles Joker on it, Carter hypnotizes Bruce and Dick where they end up in ancient Bagdad which is being terrorized by the Crier (a crying villain who resembles Joker). Batman and Robin apprehend Crier and prevent a mass-panic where Crier claimed that the nearby volcano was going to erupt. Batman eventually finds the rug (the same one that was at the auction) which turned out to have been in Crier's possession.

When a carving found by archaeologists traces back to the Age of Viking and has a carving of Bruce Wayne on it, Bruce decides to investigate where he has Carter send him back in time. Bruce and Dick arrive in the Age of Vikings where he is recognized by the townspeople as a coward. Bruce becomes Batman and discovers that his look-a-like is Olaf Erickson who was disgraced in battle and is now a prisoner. Batman rescues Olaf Erickson. He then faces several challenges posing as Olaf which help prove his courage. Olaf then leads an expedition to America where Batman's scientific knowledge saves the Vikings from an Indian attack. Olaf redeems himself in the process. The Vikings then honor him with the carving.

Carter hypnotizes Bruce where they are sent back in time to 1854 to discover what really happened to the treasure of Rex Spears, the ancestor of one of Bruce Wayne's friends. They discover that Spears and young orphan Lorenzo Bagg are transporting the money by stagecoach. Bandits attack the coach forcing Spears to retreat into a canyon. The former prospector is fatally bitten by a rattlesnake. Before dying, he buried the treasure in the canyon. Batman and Robin then see an avalanche which covers the area. When Bruce and Dick return to their own time, they are able to remember the location of the treasure. They then aid the descendants of Rex Spears and Lorenzo Bagg to uncover the money and the will of Rex Spears.

Carter sends Batman and Robin into the future where they accidentally prevent the apprehension of the space pirate Zarro since the police chief looks like Joker. To make up for the mistake, Batman offers to help stop the space pirates that have been looting space ships. Batman takes a job at the Milman space ship factory where he suspects the pirates are being tipped off. With Batman's help, Zarro is apprehended. A saboteur damages Milman's best ship, so Batman enters a specially-constructed Bat-Ship in a race around the Solar System. The saboteur strikes again, but Batman wins the race anyway. Batman then fingers the engineer Erkham and the saboteur who was working for a rival company.

Bruce Wayne discovers a 13th Century Chinese rocket that displays Batman's picture. Carter Nichols sends him and Dick back in time to meet Marco Polo and discover the secret of the rocket. They save Polo's life, but they are unable to stop his rival Bahung from taking over Polo's territory and troops with a deceitful trick. Batman and Robin then ride to warn Kubla Khan about Bahung's invasion. To earn Kubla Khan's trust, Batman and Robin perform circus tricks. They then expose a traitor named Wong Tso who had conspired with Bahung. With the warning, Kubla Khan is able to prepare by using newly invented gunpowder to create rockets. He uses Batman's face to scare off the attackers. The Dynamic Duo then return to their own time period.

In the mid-1970s the character was reintroduced in the Super Friends continuity as a mentor for the Wonder Twins, who lived with him in their civil identities of John and Joanna Flemming.

He was depicted as an older man still assisting Bruce Wayne with his "time travel hypnosis" where his latest one has Batman teaming up with Scalphunter when Batman was placed in 1862 to learn the secret of the Bat-Emblem in a Civil War campaign patch.

In 2010, the character reappeared in the Batman: The Return of Bruce Wayne storyline where the Black Glove (led by the mysterious Doctor Simon Hurt) attempted to convince Carter to help aid them in sacrificing an amnesiac victim to the bat god Barbatos in exchange for funding for his time-travel experiments. Carter Nichols rejects the offer when he refused to participate in the sacrifice which enabled the amnesiac victim (who turned out to be Bruce Wayne) to escape through time. Simon Hurt arranged for Carter Nichols to not be taken seriously as a scientist. At some earlier point in Batman's history, Joker, Riddler, Catwoman, Scarecrow, and the Imposter Mad Hatter trap Batman and Robin in a torture device that they had Carter Nichols make. In the present, Batman (Dick Grayson) and Robin investigate Carter Nichols' lab and find him dead. Although Dick notices that Carter Nichols is in his eighties, he states that he should be in his sixties. At some point in the future, Damian Wayne as Batman is investigating on how Carter Nichols died.

Alternate versions of Carter Nichols
 15 years into the future as part of the Batman in Bethlehem story, an elderly Nichols appears dead in front of Damian Wayne (who has become the third Batman).

Carter Nichols in other media
 Professor Carter Nichols appears in the Batman: The Brave and the Bold episode "Last Bat on Earth!", voiced by Richard McGonagle. Gorilla Grodd forces him to transport him to Kamandi's time using a Time-Ray Machine. Carter later uses it to transport Batman there to stop him.
 C. Nichols is mentioned in the Arrow episode "Time of Death" as an employee of Kord Industries.

Nighthawk

Nightmaster

Nightrider

Nightrunner

Nightshade

Nightslayer

Nightwing

Nite Owl

Nite-Wing

Nocturna

Non

Noose

Northwind

Nuklon

Albert Rothstein

Gerome McKenna
Gerome McKenna is one of the first official subjects for Lex Luthor's "Everyman Project". Luthor's project grants super-powers to McKenna, who is given the codename Nuklon after Luthor buys the rights to Infinity Inc. from the Pemberton Estate.

After Luthor shut down his Metagene, Gerome went into a deep state of depression and self-absorption. Gerome discovered that he has gained a new power, the ability to create a fully functional, independently thinking duplicate of himself, seemingly without control. As the series progressed, he managed to create another copy. However this version is dark and amoral, wishing to replace the original. Infinity Inc. was presented with new costumes and names with Gerome being given the codename Double Trouble. Gerome's dark double was later captured by Dr. Bud Fogel and conditioned to be a fighter in The Dark Side Club. Double Trouble's dark double killed the original, gaining autonomy. However, Fogel then activated a machine that stripped all but three of the remaining Everyman subjects of their powers. As a result, Double Trouble's dark double simply faded out of existence.

Nyxlygsptlnz

References

 DC Comics characters: N, List of